Madgaon Junction railway station (station code: MAO) is a railway junction and major station on the Indian Railways network, specifically on the South Western Railway line to Vasco da Gama, Goa and the Konkan Railway, in Madgaon, Goa, India. The station is progressing by getting electrified and double-tracked with the addition of new platforms.

The station offers free Wi-Fi.

Administration 
Madgaon Junction falls under Karwar railway division of Konkan Railway in Goa.

Connectivity 
Madgaon railway junction in the state of Goa has direct rail connection with several major cities in India. All the major metropolitan cities of India, namely, New Delhi, Mumbai, Kolkata and Chennai. The other cities of India, Bangalore, Hubli, Mangalore, Pune, Hyderabad, Vijayawada, Visakhapatnam, Thiruvananthapuram, Kochi, Surat, Vadodara, Jaipur, Jodhpur, Bikaner, Jaisalmer, Kota, Agra, Jhansi, Jabalpur, Bhopal, Gwalior, Chandigarh, Dehradun and Patna.

Two Rajdhani Express, i.e., Trivandrum Rajdhani and Madgaon Rajdhani connect Madgaon Junction with Hazrat Nizamuddin railway station in New Delhi along with other trains like Mangala Lakshadweep Express, Kerala Sampark Kranti Express and Goa Express.

Many trains including the Konkan Kanya Express, Mandovi Express, Matsyagandha Express, Netravati Express, Dadar–Madgaon Jan Shatabdi Express connect Madgaon to Mumbai.

Lines
The South Western Railway's Guntakal–Vasco da Gama section and the Konkan Railway from Mumbai, Maharashtra to Mangalore, Karnataka pass through this junction.

Gallery

References

External links

Karwar railway division
Railway stations in South Goa district
Railway junction stations in Goa
Transport in Margao
Buildings and structures in Margao